The BET Award for Video of the Year is given to the most popular music video released the same or previous year of the year the awards are handed out. The award is only given to the performing artist(s) or group in the video. The award is not handed out to the video directors and producers. The all-time winner in this category is Beyoncé with six wins, she is also the most nominated artist with fourteen nominations along with Drake. Lady Gaga is the only white artist in history to have won this category for her Beyoncé collaboration "Video Phone".

Winners and nominees
Winners are listed first and highlighted in bold.

2000s

2010s

2020s

Multiple wins and nominations

Wins

 6 wins
 Beyoncé

 3 wins
 Outkast
 Kanye West

 2 wins
 Busta Rhymes
 Pharrell Williams
 Drake
 Bruno Mars (including credit as Silk Sonic)

Nominations

 14 nominations
 Beyoncé
 Drake

 9 nominations
 Kanye West

 8 nominations
 Jay-Z

 6 nominations
 Bruno Mars (including credit as Silk Sonic)
 Cardi B
 Chris Brown

 5 nominations
 Kendrick Lamar
 Rihanna

 4 nominations
 Missy Elliott
 Outkast
 Usher

 3 nominations
 2 Chainz
 Big Sean
 Mary J. Blige
 Alicia Keys
 Lil Wayne
 Busta Rhymes
 Snoop Dogg
 Pharrell Williams

 2 nominations
 Erykah Badu
 B.o.B
 Bryson Tiller
 Chlöe (including credit as Chloe x Halle)
 Ciara
 Common
 DJ Khaled
 Doja Cat
 Eminem
 Jamie Foxx
 John Legend
 Ludacris
 Megan Thee Stallion
 Migos
 Nicki Minaj
 P. Diddy
 Pusha T
 Silk Sonic
 T-Pain
 Young Thug

See also
 BET Award for Video Director of the Year

References

Awards established in 2001
BET Awards
American music video awards